Professional Sports Authenticator (PSA), is a US based sports card and trading card grading company.

History 
PSA was launched in July 1991 by David Hall, owner of the coin grading company Professional Coin Grading Service (PCGS), to serve collectors as a third-party card grader. When they started, they struggled as a business, due to a low demand of collectors wanting their cards to be graded. A lot of sports card dealers were against the idea of having a third-party grade their cards, and decided against using card grading as a benefit to their business. Eventually, the market quickly shifted towards wanting cards graded, due to a prevalent amount of dishonesty at trade shows. Customers rarely felt comfortable with a purchase, and always felt as though it was a gamble if they were getting a real card, and not a fake.  A third-party grading company started to make sense; a party that had no financial influence in telling you the honest grade of a card. Having a card graded gave peace of mind to customers, who can buy a card with confidence knowing it was a legitimate card, instead of believing the dealer's biased opinion on what the grade of the card is.

PSA was able to benefit from the dot-com boom, which had eBay prevail as an online auction website. This enabled more people to get into the hobby of buying and selling sports cards, and having a card graded with a third-party ensured that an image posted on an eBay listing is a legitimate card. It also allowed people to clearly know the condition of the card as well, instead of trusting the sometimes low image quality of the listing. This overall brought PSA into further popularity.

Controversies 
Overall, over the course of PSA's 30+ year history, it has had very few significant controversial issues with their grading service. However there are a few worthy of note.

The first significantly controversial card grade was in fact the first card ever graded by PSA. This was the T206 Honus Wagner card. Originally It achieved a NM-MT 8 grade. This card was originally owned by Sotheby's Sport's Consultant Bill Mastro, and purchased by Wayne Gretzky and Bruce McNall. However, it was then speculated that the card was cut from a sheet with scissors. This caused some people to question the legitimacy of PSA as a 3rd party grading service. In 2005, PSA Grader Bill Hughes, a grader of the T206 Honus Wager card, admitted in an interview with New York Daily News reporter Michael O'Keeffe that he knew the card had been trimmed when he graded the card. He stated that it would have been sacrilegious to consider that card to be trimmed, which would have completely devalued it. This card is last known to still be in its original card slab, and has been on display at the National Baseball Hall Of Fame and Museum. 

The second major controversy happened in 2019, after some online collectors began noticing cards that were modified. They began to document them, resulting in a count of at least 316 modified cards, a combined value of over $1.4million, modified by nearly a dozen people. The practice is known as card "doctoring". The FBI got involved, launching a criminal investigation, which included investigating into PSA's grading practices. The FBI learned that there were potentially thousands of tampered cards circulating through the card collector market. The cause of this was due to people looking to get a better grade from PSA, to increase their chance at a larger profit. By purchasing a low quality card, and modifying it by cutting the worn edges or corners off, they can achieve a higher grade, and thus a larger profit—that is if PSA overlooks the modification during grading. One such person allegedly involved with doctoring cards goes by the name of Gary Moser, who was found to be suspicious by the online collectors who approached the FBI. Moser, while being interviewed by the Washington Post, claimed that he does not alter cards, and that he simply assesses cards to see if they are "undergraded" - a term used to explain when a card may have been inaccurately graded by a grading company like PSA. If Moser saw a card that looked to be undergraded, he would remove the card out of the card slab and resubmit it to PSA for grading, hoping for a better grade. Oregon-based auction house PWCC said in a statement that it will no longer sell cards that were submitted to PSA by Gary Moser, and would "make it right" to any of their customers who may have purchased a doctored card from them, which included paying refunds and cooperating with other dealers to offer refunds as well.

Grading scale 
PSA's grading scale allows people who are purchasing a graded card to know a clear understanding of what to expect when they view the card, simply based on their grade. 

PSA's 10 point grading scale is as follows:

 1 - Poor - May have serious defects, low eye appeal, high levels of creasing that goes through all levels of the cardboard, dirty, discoloration, or warping.
 1.5 - Fair (FR) - May have extreme wear on the corners of the card, a worn-out surface including scuffing, scratching, chipping, or staining. The card may also have one or multiple creases, or brown or dirty edges. Card must be fully intact to achieve a Fair grade.
 2 - Good - May have rounded corners, obvious surface wear, enamel chipping, creases in multiple places, little to no original gloss, and must have a 90/10 or better centering on the front and back.
 3 - Very Good (VG) - May have some rounded corners, present surface wear, minor scuffing or scratches. Picture focus may be off-register, and edges may have noticeable wear. Most of the original gloss will have been removed, but not all. Borders may be yellowed or discolored. Card may have a visible crease, printing defects, or wax staining. Card must have a 90/10 or better centering on the front and back.
 4 - Very Good-Excellent (VG-EX) - Card may have slightly rounded corners, noticeable surface wear, light scratches or scuffing, a light visible crease, and removal of some of the original gloss of the card. Centering must have a 85/15 or better on the front, and 90/10 or better centering on the back.
 5 - Excellent (EX) - Card may have minor rounded corners, visible printing defects or surface wear, original gloss is beginning to come off, slightly out of registered picture, some minor scratches that are only visible upon close inspection, and off-whiteness of the card's borders. Centering must be 85/15 or better on the front of the card, and 90/10 or better centering on the back of the card.
 6 - Excellent-Mint (EX-MT) - Card may have visible surface wear, printing defects, or a very light scratch upon close inspection. Corners may have begun to fray, and the card's focus may be slightly out of register. Card may have a minor wax stain on the reverse, off-whiteness of the card's borders, loss of original gloss, and slight notching along the edges. Centering must be 80/20 or better on the front of the card, and the back's centering must be 90/10 or better.
 7 - Near Mint (NM) - Card may have slight surface wear upon close inspection, minor corner fraying, slightly out of focus picture, a minor printing blemish, slight waxing on the back of the card only, with most of the original gloss on the front of the card retained. Centering needs to be between 70/30 to 75/25 or better on the front of the card, where there back needs to be centered by at least 90/10 or better.
 8 - Near Mint-Mint (NM-MT) - Card may have a very slight wax stain on the reverse, extremely minor fraying on one or two corners, a minor printing imperfection, and slightly off-white borders. These imperfections should only be visible upon closer inspection. Centering needs to be between 65/35 to 70/30 on the front of the card, where the back needs to be at least 90/10 or better.
 9 - Mint - Card may have only one of the following flaws: a minor printing imperfection, slightly off-white borders, or a very slight wax stain on the reverse of the card. Centering needs to be 60/40 or better on the front of the card, and the back needs to be 90/10 or better.
 10 - Gem Mint (GEM-MT) - Card has perfectly sharp corners, original gloss is fully applied, card focus is sharp, and is free of any staining. The card may have a slight printing imperfection, if it doesn't take away from the overall appeal of the card. Centering for a Gem Mint graded card must be 55/45 to 60/40 on the front, whereas on the back is centered at 75/25 or better.

External links 

 Professional Sports Authenticator Official Website

See also 

 Trading card
 Collectors Universe

References 

Trading_card_companies